Frederick David Quillan (January 27, 1956 – September 12, 2016) was an American football offensive lineman who played in the National Football League (NFL) for the San Francisco 49ers from 1978 through 1987.  He appeared in two Super Bowls: Super Bowl XVI and Super Bowl XIX and won both. He was a two-time Pro Bowl selection.  Quillan played college football at the University of Oregon.

References

1956 births
2016 deaths
American football centers
Frankfurt Galaxy coaches
Oregon Ducks football players
San Francisco 49ers players
National Conference Pro Bowl players
Central Catholic High School (Portland, Oregon) alumni
Players of American football from Portland, Oregon
San Diego Chargers players